Elands Pass is situated in the Mpumalanga province on the National N4 road (South Africa), the road between Waterval Boven and Nelspruit (South Africa).

Mountain passes of Mpumalanga